Freestyle is a pop/R&B band from the Philippines, currently a solo project of Top Suzara since 2022. The band was formed in 1996 and hit the mainstream in 1998, and is popular for the songs "Before I Let You Go", "So Slow", "This Time", "Till I Found You", "Para Sa 'Yo", "Once in a Lifetime", and their rendition of "Bakit Ngayon Ka Lang?".

The band was originally founded by former guitarist Tat Suzara in Davao City. Notable members include vocalists Jinky Vidal and Top Suzara, the band's primary songwriter, who left the band in 2011 and 2005 respectively and went on to have solo careers. Post-Freestyle, Vidal and Top Suzara had a reunion concert together in 2013. Other notable members were vocalists Joshua Desiderio, Mike Luis, Ava Santos, and drummer Gerald Banzon who were with the band until its final batch in 2022.

In mid-2022, after the final lineup disbanded, Top Suzara took over and continued the "Freestyle" brand as a solo project accompanied by session musicians. Suzara had his first comeback performance as Freestyle at 19 East in October 2022 in a sold-out gig. Suzara also trademarked "Freestyle" in the Intellectual Property Office (IPO) solely under his name. The IPO ruled that "Freestyle" is synonymous with the name Top Suzara and is deemed the rightful owner.

Members

Current members
Christopher "Top" Suzara – vocals/guitar (1997–2005; 2022–present)

Session/touring
IJ Garcia – keyboards/vocals (2022–present)
Ian Tan  –  bass/vocals (2022–present)
Francis Manalo – guitar/vocals (2022–present)
Lerod Cailao – drums/vocals (2022–present)

Former members
Jinky Vidal – vocals (1996–2011)
Joshua Desiderio – vocals/keyboards/guitars (2005–2021)
Mike Luis – vocals/keyboards (2005–2022)
Tat Suzara – lead guitar/backing vocals (1996–2019)
Gerald Banzon – drums/percussion (1997–2021)
Ava Santos – vocals (2012–2022)
Rommel dela Cruz – bass guitar (2005–2019)
Bobby Velasco – keyboards/arranger (2018–2022)
Joel Guarin – bass guitar (2019–2022)
Gino Aguas – lead guitar (2019–2022)
Nikki Cabardo – keyboards (2000–2009)
Carlo Tapia – bass guitar (1997–2005)
Obet Luzon – keyboards (1997–2000)
Tzuki Garcia – drums/percussion (1996–1997)
Jun Masamayor – keyboards (1996–1997)

Discography

Studio albums

Compilation albums

Collaboration albums
Closer to Home (Viva Records, 1999)
Closer to Home 2 (Viva Records, 2000)
Servant of All Jubilaeum A.D. 2000 (Viva Records, 2000)
Tunog Acoustic 1 (Warner Music Philippines, 2003)
Acoustic Lokal (Viva Records, 2003)
Senti: 18 Pinoy Love Hits (Viva Records & Vicor Music, 2008)
Senti Dos (Viva Records & Vicor Music, 2008)
Hit Covers (Viva Records & Vicor Music, 2009)
Senti 3 (Viva Records & Vicor Music, 2009)
Simly Fied (More Than Acoustic) (Viva Records & Vicor Music, 2009)
Senti Four: It's Complicated (Viva Records & Vicor Music, 2010)

Live albums
The Love Concert: The Album (2001)
All Hits Live at the Araneta (2003)
Freestyle Live (2004)
Live @ 19 East (2006)

DVDs
The Love Concert: The Album (2001)
All Hits Live at the Araneta (2003)
Freestyle Live (2004)
Live @ 19 East (2006)

Awards and nominations

References

External links
 – new official page
 

Freestyle Interview

Filipino contemporary R&B musical groups
Filipino pop music groups
Musical groups established in 1996
Musical groups from Davao City
Viva Records (Philippines) artists